The 1978 North American Soccer League season was the 66th season of FIFA-sanctioned soccer, the 11th with a national first-division league, in the United States and Canada.

Changes from the previous season

New teams

Colorado Caribous
Detroit Express
Houston Hurricane

Memphis Rogues
New England Tea Men
Philadelphia Fury

Teams folding
None

Teams moving
Connecticut Bicentennials to Oakland Stompers
Las Vegas Quicksilver to San Diego Sockers
St. Louis Stars to California Surf
Team Hawaii to Tulsa Roughnecks

Name changes
None

Season recap
Bolstered by the success of the previous season, the league added six teams to reach 24 in total. The Colorado Caribous launched in Denver, the Detroit Express and Houston Hurricane became the second and third teams to play in fully enclosed indoor stadiums, the Philadelphia Fury brought soccer back to Philadelphia,  the New England Tea Men would be the third attempt to have NASL soccer succeed in the Boston area and the Memphis Rogues would bring pro soccer to Tennessee.

There were also the usual franchise movements. Team Hawaii became the Tulsa Roughnecks, the Las Vegas Quicksilver became the San Diego Sockers, the Connecticut Bicentennials became the Oakland Stompers and the St. Louis Stars moved to Anaheim to become the California Surf.

With so many new clubs, the NASL realigned into a six-division format while expanding the playoffs to include 16 teams. The new alignment was a direct copy of the NFL's setup, as the new three-division conferences were called the 'American Soccer Conference' and the 'National Soccer Conference', respectively. Each conference had East, Central and West divisions as well.

The top two teams in each division would quality for the playoffs. The other spots would go to the next best two teams in the conference, regardless of division. The top three seeds went to the division winners, seeds 4-6 went to the second place teams and the last two seeds were known as 'wild-cards' – another nod to the NFL. The winners of each successive round would be reseeded within the conference.  The first round and the Soccer Bowl were single games, while the conference semifinals and championships were two-game series. As in the 1977 playoffs, if both teams were tied at one win apiece at the conclusion of Game 2, there would be a 30-minute sudden-death mini-game and a shootout if necessary.

The Cosmos would set records for most wins and points in an NASL season, thanks to their 24-6 regular-season mark (shared with the Vancouver Whitecaps) and 212 points. The Cosmos beat the Ft. Lauderdale Strikers, 7–0, on opening day and never looked back, scoring 88 times while losing just three games in regulation. Giorgio Chinaglia scored 34 goals and 79 points, setting league records in the process. He did not win regular season MVP honors, however. That award went to New England's Mike Flanagan, who scored 30 goals and 68 points while leading the Tea Men to an unlikely ASC East title. At the age of 36, Alan Hinton of Vancouver set a league record of his own with 30 assists.

Still, the Cosmos needed a major rally to beat the Minnesota Kicks in the NSC playoffs. The Kicks won the first game by an extraordinary 9–2 score behind Alan Willey's five goals, but the Cosmos won Game 2, 4–0, back at Giants Stadium. The resulting mini-game went to a shootout, and Carlos Alberto and Franz Beckenbauer scored goals to keep the Cosmos alive. The Portland Timbers were shut out over both games of the National Conference final, and the Tampa Bay Rowdies were beaten before 74,901 fans at Giants Stadium in the Soccer Bowl. The Cosmos became the first back-to-back champions in NASL history.

After the season the Colorado Caribous would move to Atlanta, while the Oakland Stompers would move to Edmonton just two months before the start of the 1979 NASL season. The Stompers had drawn over 32,000 for their opening game at the Oakland Coliseum, but were drawing crowds under 10,000 by the end of the season. The Caribous had the worst record in the league and only drew one crowd bigger than 10,000 the entire year.

Regular season
W = Wins, L = Losses, GF = Goals For, GA = Goals Against, BP = Bonus Points, Pts = Point System

6 points for a win,
0 points for a loss,
1 point for each regulation goal scored up to three per game.
-Premiers (most points). -Other playoff teams.

American Conference

National Conference

NASL League Leaders

Scoring
GP = Games Played, G = Goals (worth 2 points), A = Assists (worth 1 point), Pts = Points

Goalkeeping
Note: GP = Games played; Min = Minutes played; GA = Goals against; GAA = Goals against average; W = Wins; L = Losses; SO = Shutouts

NASL All-Stars

Playoffs

The first round and the Soccer Bowl were single game match ups, while the conference semifinals and championships were all two-game series.

Bracket

Conference Quarterfinals

Conference semifinals
In 1978, if a playoff series was tied after two games, a 30 minute, golden goal, mini-game was played. If neither team scored in the mini-game, they would move on to a shoot-out to determine a series winner. *Teams were re-seeded for the Conference Semifinals based on regular season point totals. This affected only one of the four series; Tampa Bay versus San Diego.

Conference Championships

Soccer Bowl '78

1978 NASL Champions: Cosmos

Playoff Statistics

Mini-games are not counted as games played when compiling individual statistics. They are included in the minutes played category.

Scoring
GP = Games Played, G = Goals (worth 2 points), A = Assists (worth 1 point), Pts = Points

Goalkeeping
Note: GP = Games played; Min = Minutes played; GA = Goals against; GAA = Goals against average; W = Wins; L = Losses; SO = Shutouts

Post season awards
Most Valuable Player: Mike Flanagan, New England
Coach of the Year: Tony Waiters, Vancouver
Rookie of the Year: Gary Etherington, Cosmos
North American Player of the Year: Bob Lenarduzzi, Vancouver

Team attendance totals

References

External links
 The Year in American Soccer – 1978
 Chris Page's NASL Archive

 
North American Soccer League (1968–1984) seasons
1
1978 in Canadian soccer